Statistics of Lebanese Premier League for the 2003–04 season.

Overview
Al Nejmeh won the championship.

League standings

References
RSSSF

Leb
2003–04 in Lebanese football
Lebanese Premier League seasons
2003–04 Lebanese Premier League